The 2012 IFA Shield Final was the 116th final of the IFA Shield, the second oldest football competition in India, and was contested between Kolkata clubs East Bengal and Prayag United on 16 March 2012.

East Bengal won the final 4–2 via penalties after the game remained goal-less after extra-time, to claim their 28th IFA Shield title.

Route to the final

East Bengal

East Bengal entered the 2012 IFA Shield as one of the I-League playing teams from Kolkata and were allocated into Group A alongside Shillong Lajong and Bhawanipore FC. In the opening game against Bhawanipur, East Bengal managed a 2–1 victory with striker Robin Singh scoring a brace. Biswajit Biswas scored the goal for Bhawanipur. In the second group game against Shillong Lajong, East Bengal managed a comfortable 3–0 win with goals from Tolgay Ozbey, Gurwinder Singh and Robin Singh, to secure a place in the semis. In the Semi Final, East Bengal club faced Pailan Arrows, the topper of Group C, and managed a 1–0 win courtesy of a Tolgay Ozbey strike to enter the final for the 40th time.

Prayag United

Prayag United entered the 2012 IFA Shield as one of the I-League playing teams from Kolkata and were allocated into Group D alongside Mumbai F.C. and Techno Aryan. In their opening game, they defeated Mumbai FC 3–2 with Yusif Yakubu scoring a brace and Denson Devadas scoring the other for Prayag. Gbeneme Friday and Chhangte Malsawmkima scored for Mumbai. In their second game, Prayag defeated Aryan 1–0 with a long range effort from Bello Razaq to reach the semis. In the Semi-Final, Prayag United faced Brazilian team Botafogo BFR and won 1–0 courtesy of a goal from Kiwi striker Kayne Vincent in the 115th minute to take Prayag United into the final.

Match

Details

See also
 IFA Shield 2012

References

IFA Shield finals
2011–12 in Indian football
East Bengal Club matches
United SC matches
Football competitions in Kolkata